William ("Mickey") Roche (born 20 July 1871, Brunswick, Victoria, Australia; died 2 January 1950, East Brunswick, Melbourne, Victoria, Australia) was an Australian cricketer who played in Australia and England.

Mickey (also known as Micky) Roche was an off-spinner and useful lower-order right-handed batsman who represented Victoria between 1895 and 1898. He also served Middlesex as a professional from 1897 and 1900. His best season was in 1899 when he took 60 wickets (which included 7 for 103 versus Lancashire). Whilst batting at number 11, he scored 74 not out versus Kent, adding a county record stand of 230 for the 10th wicket with Richard Nicholls. He notably only had two fingers and a thumb on his bowling hand.

Roche also played for the Melbourne Football Club between 1893 and 1895. In June 1895 he kicked six goals in a game, the most by any Melbourne played in the Victorian Football Association competition.

See also
 List of Victoria first-class cricketers

References

External links
 Cricket Archive profile
 ESPN cricinfo profile
 Mick Roche on Demonwiki

1871 births
1950 deaths
Australian cricketers
Marylebone Cricket Club cricketers
Middlesex cricketers
Victoria cricketers
Australian rules footballers from Melbourne
Melbourne Football Club (VFA) players
A. J. Webbe's XI cricketers
People from Brunswick, Victoria
Cricketers from Melbourne